Niels Christian Olesen Christensen (1 January 1881 – 18 May 1945) was a Danish sport shooter who competed in the 1908 Summer Olympics.

He was born in Sundby, but represented the club Kjøbenhavns Skytteforening. In the 1908 Summer Olympics he finished fourth in the team free rifle event, eighth in the ream military rifle event and 48th in the 300 metre free rifle event. He died in 1945 in Århus.

References

1881 births
1945 deaths
Danish male sport shooters
ISSF rifle shooters
Olympic shooters of Denmark
Shooters at the 1908 Summer Olympics
Sportspeople from the North Jutland Region